The Lake Dana is a freshwater body of the territory of Eeyou Istchee Baie-James (municipality), in the administrative region of Nord-du-Québec, in the province of Quebec, at Canada.

The surface of the lake is usually frozen from early November to mid-May, however, safe ice circulation is generally from mid-November to mid-April.

Geography 

The northern part is crescent-shaped and has a navigable length of  including the bay of the Utamikaneu River. It receives on the West side the waters of the Utamikaneu River and on the North side the discharge of Du Tast Lake. The northern part of the lake includes Wapushunikw Peninsula, Kaupakameyach Point and Chipikamikw Point.

The southern part of the lake receives the waters of the [Pauschikushish Ewiwach River], the Enistustikweyach River and the Upaunan River. These last two rivers flow into Kapichiwashahach Bay. The Mitapeschikaw hill is located west of the southern part of the lake and the Epaschipich hill to the East.

Lake Dana has many bays and peninsulas. The area around Lake Dana has many marshes.

The mouth of Dana Lake is directly connected by a short strait to Evans Lake, designated Pastukamau Pass, which connects it to the West Bay of Evans Lake. This mouth is located at the bottom of a bay in the Northwest to:
 Southwest of the mouth of Evans Lake;
 Southwest of Kirk Island, located on Evans Lake;
 East of the mouth of the Broadback River (confluence with James Bay);
 North of downtown Matagami

The main hydrographic slopes near Lake Dana are:
 North side: Broadback River, Rupert River;
 East side: Evans Lake, Broadback River;
 South side: Muskiki River, Chabinoche river, Enistustikweyach river;
 West side: Rodayer Lake, Desorsons Lake, Nottaway River.

Toponymy
The toponym "Lac Dana" was formalized on December 5, 1968, by the Commission de toponymie du Québec when it was created.

Notes and references

See also 

Broadback River, a watercourse
Evans Lake, a body of water
Du Tast Lake, a body of water
Etamikaneu River, a watercourse
Utamikaneu River, a watercourse
Pauschikushish Ewiwach River, a watercourse
Enistustikweyach River, a watercourse
Upaunan River, a watercourse
Eeyou Istchee Baie-James (municipality), a municipality
List of lakes in Canada

Lakes of Nord-du-Québec